Karel deLeeuw, or de Leeuw ( – ), was a mathematics professor at Stanford University, specializing in harmonic analysis and functional analysis.

Life and career
Born in Chicago, Illinois, he attended the Illinois Institute of Technology and the University of Chicago, earning a B.S. degree in 1950. He stayed at Chicago to earn an M.S. degree in mathematics in 1951, then went to Princeton University, where he obtained a Ph.D. degree in 1954. His thesis, titled "The relative cohomology structure of formations", was written under the direction of Emil Artin.

After first teaching mathematics at Dartmouth College and the University of Wisconsin–Madison, he joined the Stanford University faculty in 1957, becoming a full professor in 1966. During sabbaticals and leaves he also spent time at the Institute for Advanced Study and at Churchill College, Cambridge (where he was a Fulbright Fellow).  He was also a Member-at-Large of the Council of the American Mathematical Society.

Death and legacy
DeLeeuw was murdered by Theodore Streleski, a Stanford doctoral student for 19 years, whom he briefly advised. DeLeeuw's widow Sita deLeeuw was critical of media coverage of the crime, saying, "The media, in their eagerness to give Streleski a forum, become themselves accomplices in the murder—giving Streleski what he wanted in the first place."

A memorial lecture series was established in 1978 by the Stanford Department of Mathematics to honor deLeeuw's memory.

Selected publications

References

External links
 

20th-century American mathematicians
Mathematical analysts
Stanford University Department of Mathematics faculty
Princeton University alumni
Dartmouth College faculty
University of Wisconsin–Madison faculty
People from Chicago
1930 births
1978 deaths
People murdered in California
Deaths by beating in the United States
Illinois Institute of Technology alumni
Mathematicians from Illinois
American textbook writers